Maude Victoria Barlow (born May 24, 1947) is a Canadian author and activist. She is a founding member of the Council of Canadians, a citizens' advocacy organization with members and chapters across Canada. She is also the co-founder of the Blue Planet Project, which works internationally for the human right to water. Barlow chairs the board of Washington-based Food & Water Watch, is a founding member of the San Francisco–based International Forum on Globalization, and a Councillor with the Hamburg-based World Future Council. In 2008/2009, she served as Senior Advisor on Water to the 63rd President of the United Nations General Assembly and was a leader in the campaign to have water recognized as a human right by the UN.

She has authored and co-authored 19 books, including her latest, Boiling Point: Government Neglect, Corporate Abuse, and Canada's Water Crisis and Whose Water is it Anyway? Taking water protection into public hands.

Water policy 
Barlow proposes the remunicipalization of the water and sanitation services because "the public and communities lose control as local government officials abdicate control over a vital public service, private water companies are accountable to their shareholders, not to the people they serve and often restrict public access to information about their operations Because they have to make a profit, they have to cut corners, raise water rates or lay off workers - often all three."

Film
Barlow is in the feature documentary film Blue Gold: World Water Wars by Sam Bozzo.

Barlow is featured in two other recent documentaries about water rights issues: Irena Salina's documentary Flow: For Love of Water, and Liz Marshall's Water on the Table. Barlow also contributes to a blog associated with Water on the Table.

Barlow is the subject of a National Film Board of Canada documentary Democracy à la Maude as well as a CBC TV Life and Times biography.

The Bollywood film Paani, being directed by Shekhar Kapur, is based on Blue Covenant: The Global Water Crisis and the Coming Battle for the Right.

Awards
Barlow is the recipient of fourteen honorary doctorates as well as many awards, including the 2005 Right Livelihood Award (known as the "Alternative Nobel"), the 2005 Lannan Foundation Cultural Freedom Fellowship Award, the Citation of Lifetime Achievement at the 2008 Canadian Environment Awards, the 2009 Earth Day Canada Outstanding Environmental Achievement Award, the 2009 Planet in Focus Eco Hero Award, and the 2011 EarthCare Award, the highest international honour of the Sierra Club (US).

Published works

Books: Principal author or co-author
Parcel of Rogues: How Free Trade Is Failing Canada – Key Porter Books, Toronto (1990)
Take Back the Nation (with Bruce Campbell) – Key Porter Books, Toronto (1992)
Take Back the Nation 2 (with Bruce Campbell) – Key Porter Books, Toronto (1993)
Class Warfare: The Assault on Canada's Schools (with Heather-Jane Robertson) – Key Porter Books, Toronto (1994) .
Straight through the Heart: How the Liberals Abandoned the Just Society (with Bruce Campbell) – HarperCollins, Toronto (1995) .
The Big Black Book: The Essential Views of Conrad and Barbara Amiel Black (with Jim Winter) – Stoddart, Toronto (1997) .
MAI: The Multilateral Agreement on Investment and the Threat to Canadian Sovereignty (with Tony Clarke) – Stoddart (1997) .
MAI: The Multilateral Agreement on Investment and the Threat to American Freedom (with Tony Clarke) – Stoddart, Toronto (1998)
The Fight of My Life: Confessions of an Unrepentant Canadian – HarperCollins, Toronto (1998) .
MAI: The Multilateral Agreement on Investment Round 2; New Global and Internal Threats to Canadian Sovereignty (with Tony Clarke) – Stoddart, Toronto (1998)
Frederick Street: Life and Death on Canada's Love Canal (with Elizabeth May) – HarperCollins, Toronto (2000)
Global Showdown: How the New Activists Are Fighting Global Corporate Rule (with Tony Clarke) – Stoddart, Toronto (2001) .
Blue Gold: The Battle Against Corporate Theft of the World's Water (with Tony Clarke) – Stoddart, Toronto (2002) .
Profit Is Not the Cure: A Citizen's Guide to Saving Medicare – McCelland & Stewart, Toronto (2002) .
Too Close For Comfort; Canada's Future Within Fortress North America – McClelland & Stewart, Toronto (2005) .
Blue Covenant: The Global Water Crisis and the Fight for the Right to Water – McClelland & Stewart, Toronto (October 16, 2007) . Also available in French, Arabic, Japanese, Portuguese, Korean, Greek, Turkish, and Spanish.
Blue Future: Protecting Water for People and the Planet Forever - House of Anansi, Inc., Toronto (September 2013)  (print version), 978-1-7708-9407-5 (e-book).
Boiling Point: Government Neglect, Corporate Abuse, and Canada's Water Crisis - ECW Press, Toronto (September 2016)  (print version).
Whose Water is it Anyway? Taking water protection into public hands. - ECW Press, Toronto (September 2019)  (print version).

Books: contributing author

Trading Freedom: How Free Trade Affect our Lives, Work, and Environment – Institute for Policy Studies, Washington (1992)
The American Review of Canadian Studies – Twentieth Anniversary Issue of The Association for Canadian Studies in the United States, Washington (1992)
Crossing the Line: Canada and Free Trade With Mexico- New Star Publications, Vancouver (1992)
The Charlottetown Accord, the Referendum, and the Future of Canada – University of Toronto Press, Toronto (1993)
The Trojan Horse: Alberta and the Future of Canada – Black Rose Books, Edmonton (1995)
The Case Against the Global Economy – Sierra Club Books, New York (1996)
Globalization and the Live Performing Arts, Conference Papers – Monash University, Melbourne (2001)
Alternatives to Economic Globalization, a Report of the International Forum on Globalization – Berrett-Koehler Publishers, San Francisco (2002)
Whose Water Is It? The Unquenchable Thirst of a Water-Hungry World – Edited by Bernadette McDonald and Douglas Jehl, National Geographic, Washington (2003)
Meeting the Global Challenge: Competitive Position and Strategic Response – BMA Program, Edited by Tom Wesson, York University Press, Toronto (2004)
Globalization, Human Rights & Citizenship, An Anthology From the Gannett Lecture Series – Rochester Institute of Technology, Edited by Robert Manning – trade paperback (2005)

Reports
Blue Gold: The Global Water Crisis and the Commodification of the World’s Water Supply – International Forum on Globalization, San Francisco (June 1999) 
The Free Trade Area of the Americas, The Threat to Social Programs, Environmental Sustainability and Social Justice – International Forum on Globalization, San Francisco (February 2001)
The World Trade Organization and the Threat to Canada's Social Programs – The Council of Canadians, Ottawa (September 2001)
Profit is not the Cure: A Call to Action on the Future of Health Care in Canada – The Council of Canadians, Ottawa (Winter 2002)
Making the Links, A Citizen's Guide to the World Trade Organization and the Free Trade Area of the Americas (with Tony Clarke) – The Council of Canadians, Ottawa (Summer 2003)
The Global Fight Against Privatization of Water – Annual Report, The World Forum on Alternatives, Geneva (April 2004)
The Canada We Want, A Citizen's Alternative to Deep Integration – The Council of Canadians, Ottawa (March 2004)

See also
 Free trade debate

References

External links

 The Council of Canadians – Maude Barlow
 Blue Planet Project
 Maude Barlow Interview with Jeff Fleischer of Mother Jones
 Maude Barlow on the Need for Water Justice – video report by Democracy Now!
 Video: Maude Barlow: "The World Has Divided into Rich and Poor as at No Time in History"
 Video: Maude Barlow: "The Continued Destruction of the Earth Can Go on Quite Happily"
 Right Livelihood Award
 Huffington Post (Canada) – Maude Barlow
 Watch Democracy à la Maude at NFB.ca

1947 births
Living people
Activists from Toronto
Anti-globalization activists
Anti-globalization writers
Canadian activists
Canadian environmentalists
Canadian feminists
Canadian officials of the United Nations
Canadian political writers
Canadian women activists
Canadian women environmentalists
Carnegie Council for Ethics in International Affairs
Privatization in Canada
Water and politics
Water privatization
Writers from Toronto
Canadian nationalists